Selago is a genus of plants in the family Scrophulariaceae, closely related to Scrophularia and Verbascum. It contains around 190 species, mostly in southern Africa; two are listed on the IUCN Red List:
 Selago lepida Hilliard
 Selago nachtigalii Rolfe

References

 
Scrophulariaceae genera
Taxonomy articles created by Polbot